Bucklin voting is a class of voting methods that can be used for single-member and multi-member districts. As in highest median rules like the majority judgment, the Bucklin winner will be one of the candidates with the highest median ranking or rating. It is named after its original promoter, the Georgist politician James W. Bucklin of Grand Junction, Colorado, and is also known as the Grand Junction system.

Voting process
Bucklin rules varied, but here is a typical example:

Voters are allowed rank preference ballots (first, second, third, etc.).

First choice votes are first counted. If one candidate has a majority, that candidate wins. Otherwise the second choices are added to the first choices. Again, if a candidate with a majority vote is found, the winner is the candidate with the most votes accumulated. Lower rankings are added as needed.

A majority is determined based on the number of valid ballots. Since, after the first round, there may be more votes cast than voters, it is possible for more than one candidate to have majority support.

Variants and relationships to other methods 
The term Bucklin voting refers to the process of counting all votes on all ballots that are above some threshold, and then adjusting that threshold down until a majority is reached. In some variants which have been used, equal ranking was allowed at some or all ranks. Some variants had a predetermined number of ranks available (usually 2 or 3), while others had unlimited ranks. There were also variants akin to Borda voting in that lower-ranked votes counted for less.

The Bucklin procedure is one way to ensure that the winning candidate will be among those with the highest median vote. When used with a cardinal voting scale instead of ordinal ranking, Bucklin's balloting method is the same as that of highest median rules like the Majority Judgment. However, Bucklin's selection algorithm starts with the highest rated votes and adds lower ones until a median winner is reached, whereas Majority Judgment starts with the median votes and removes them until all but one candidate is eliminated. Due to this difference, Bucklin passes some voting criteria that Majority Judgment fails, and vice versa.

Bucklin applied to multiwinner elections
Bucklin was used for multiwinner elections.  For multi-member districts, voters marked as many first choices as there are seats to be filled.  Voters marked the same number of second and further choices.  In some localities, the voter was required to mark a full set of first choices for his or her ballot to be valid. However, allowing voters to cast three simultaneous votes for three seats (block voting) could allow an organized 51%, or the largest minority in a contest with three or more slates, to win all three seats in the first round, so this method does not give proportional representation.

History and usage 
The method was proposed by Condorcet in 1793. It was re-invented under its current name and used in many political elections in the United States in the early 20th century, as were other experimental election methods during the progressive era. Bucklin voting was first used in 1909 in Grand Junction, Colorado, and then used in more than sixty other cities including Denver and San Francisco.

In two states, it was found to violate the state constitution and overturned; in the remainder of states using it, it was repealed. In Minnesota, it was ruled unconstitutional, in a decision that disallowed votes for multiple candidates, in opposition to some voters' single expressed preference, and in a variant used in Oklahoma, the particular application required voters in multi-candidate elections to rank more than one candidate, or the vote would not be counted; and the preferential primary was therefore found unconstitutional. The canvassing method itself was not rejected in Oklahoma.

Satisfied and failed criteria 
Bucklin voting satisfies the majority criterion, the mutual majority criterion and the monotonicity criterion.

Bucklin voting without equal rankings allowed fails the Condorcet criterion, independence of clones criterion, later-no-harm, participation, consistency, reversal symmetry, the Condorcet loser criterion and the independence of irrelevant alternatives criterion.

If equal and skipped rankings are allowed, Bucklin passes or fails the same criteria as highest median rules like the Majority Judgment.

Example application

The first round has no majority winner. Therefore, the second rank votes are added. This moves Nashville and Chattanooga above 50%, so a winner can be determined. Since Nashville is supported by a higher majority (68% versus 58%), Nashville is the winner.

Voter strategy 
Voters supporting a strong candidate have an incentive to bullet vote (offer only one first-rank vote), in hopes that other voters will add enough votes to help their candidate win. This strategy is most secure if the supported candidate appears likely to gain many second-rank votes.

In the above example, Memphis voters have the most first-place votes and might not offer a second preference in hopes of winning, but the strategy fails, unless other voters also bullet vote, because they are not a second-place choice of competitors.

If all Memphis voters bullet vote, Chattanooga voters could cause their city to win by all bullet voting. However, if all Nashville voters also do the same, Memphis would win on the fourth and final round.  In that case, Knoxville voters could do nothing to change the outcome.

In this particular example (but not always), bullet voting benefits one group of voters only if another group or groups do it as well.  The example shows that, depending upon who does it, bullet voting may distort the outcome and could be counterproductive for some voters who do it (here, those from Chattanooga and Nashville).

To prevent bullet voting, voters could be required to rank all candidates on the ballot. This would provide the voter with a disincentive to bullet vote, as the vote would not be counted unless all candidates are ranked.

See also
 List of democracy and elections-related topics
 Voting system
 Plurality voting system
 Instant-runoff voting
 Approval voting
 Score voting
 Borda count
 Expanding Approvals Rule

References
Specific

General
 Municipal Voting System Reform: Overcoming the Legal Obstacles (History of use of Bucklin voting in Duluth, Minnesota in 1912)
 Grand Junction people: James Bucklin

Non-proportional multi-winner electoral systems
Single-winner electoral systems
Preferential electoral systems
Non-monotonic electoral systems

Notes